Universitas Sanata Dharma also referred to by its acronym USD or Sadhar is a private, Catholic, research, coeducational higher education institution run by the Indonesian Province of the Society of Jesus in Yogyakarta Indonesia.  The two words, "Sanatana Dharma", come from the ancient Sanskrit language. "Sanatana" is a Sanskrit word that denotes that which is Anadi (beginningless), Anantha (endless) and does not cease to be, that which is eternal and everlasting. With its rich connotations, Dharma is not translatable to any other language. Dharma is from dhri, meaning to hold together, to sustain. Its approximate meaning is "Natural Law," or those principles of reality which are inherent in the very nature and design of the universe. Thus the term Sanatana Dharma can be roughly translated to mean "the natural, ancient and eternal way". The dedication is to the greater glory of God and the service is to humanity. Universitas Sanata Dharma has 8 undergraduate schools with 25 departments, along with 7 graduate programs, 1 professional program, and 3 certificate programs.

History

PTPG Sanata Dharma era (1955–1958)
In 1955 Catholic missionaries of the religious order of the Society of Jesus in Central Java along with lay intellectuals decided to found a teacher training college. With the support of the Congregatio de Propaganda Fide, Father Kester, the superior of the Jesuit missionaries, united the diploma courses in Education under de Britto Foundation in Yogyakarta and in English under the Loyola Foundation in Semarang into a higher learning institution and so was born PTPG Sanata Dharma on October 20, 1955. At that time, Sanata Dharma had four departments: Education, English, History, and Natural Sciences. The superior of the Jesuit mission appointed Father Nicolaus Driyarkara as the dean and Father H. Loeff as the vice dean.

FKIP Sanata Dharma era (1958–1965)
In November 1958 Sanata Dharma was renamed FKIP Sanata Dharma (Faculty of Teacher Training and Education).

IKIP Sanata Dharma era (1965–1993)
In 1965 the Faculty was changed into IKIP Sanata Dharma (Sanata Dharma Institute of Teacher Training and Education). Since 1979 this institute has run both bachelor and diploma programs in mathematics, physics, Indonesian, English, and social science.

Universitas Sanata Dharma era (1993–present)
To meet the demands, needs and requirements of the community and the progress of science and technology, on April 20, 1993, IKIP Sanata Dharma was developed into Sanata Dharma University.

Currently the university works in collaboration with 158 domestic and 19 foreign institutions, and is listed by QS among top universities. It also participates in the Fulbright visiting scholar program with the USA.

Rectors
     
 Rev. Nicolaus Drijarkara, S.J. (1955–1967)
 Rev. Josephus Ignatius G.M. Drost, S.J. (1968–1976) 
 Rev. AM Kuylaars Kadarman, S.J. (1977–1984) 
 Rev. F.X. Danuwinata, S.J. (1984–1988) 

 A. Tutoyo (1988–1993) 
 Rev. Michael Sastrapratedja, S.J. (1993–2001) 
 Rev. Paulus Suparno, S.J. (2001–2006)
 Rev. Paulus Wiryono Priyotamtomo, S.J. (2006–2014)
 Yohanes Eka Priyatma, Ph.D (2013–Present)

Undergraduate schools
         
 School of Teacher Training and Education 
 Department of Guidance and Counseling 
 Department of English Language Education 
 Department of Indonesian, Local Languages, & Literature Education
 Department of Economics of Cooperatives Education
 Department of Accounting Education
 Department of History Education 
 Department of Mathematics Education
 Department of Physics Education
 Department of Catholic Religion Education
 Department of Primary School Teacher Education (S1)
 School of Letters 
 Department of English Language and Literature 
 Department of History 
 Department of Indonesian Language and Literature
 School of Theology
 
 School of Economics 
 Department of Accounting 
 Department of Management
 Department of Economics
 School of Psychology
 School of Mathematics and Natural Sciences 
 Department of Mathematics 
 Department of Physics 
 Department of Computer Sciences
 School of Engineering 
 Department of Electrical Engineering 
 Department of Informatics Technology 
 Department of Mechanical Engineering 
 Department of Mechatronics (3-year, diploma)
 School of Pharmacy 
 Department of Pharmacy 
 Pharmacist Profession Course

Graduate programs
      
 English Studies 
 English Language Education 
 Indonesian Language and Literature Education
 Religious and Cultural Studies 

 Theology 
 Management
 Mathematics Education

Certified programs
 English Extension Course 
 Training for Interactive Communication in English (60-hour program) 
 Indonesian Language and Culture Intensive Course

See also
 List of Jesuit sites

References

USD Official Site

U
Universities in the Special Region of Yogyakarta
Universities in Indonesia
Sleman Regency
Association of Christian Universities and Colleges in Asia
Jesuit universities and colleges
Private universities and colleges in Indonesia